"Silent Water" is a song by Blue System. It is the ninth and penultimate track on their 1988 second studio album, Body Heat. The song was released as a single in the beginning of January 1989.

The single debuted at number 13 in West Germany for the week of January 16, 1989. The song was the Title song from the German Television movie Tatort: Moltke

Composition 
The song is written and produced by Dieter Bohlen.

Charts

References

External links 
 

1988 songs
1989 singles
Blue System songs
Hansa Records singles
Songs written by Dieter Bohlen
Song recordings produced by Dieter Bohlen